Brevicaudosaurus is an extinct genus of nothosauroid marine sauropterygian from the Middle Triassic of China. The type species is Brevicaudosaurus jiyangshanensis.

References 

Nothosauroids